Winlink, or formally, Winlink Global Radio Email (registered US Service Mark), also known as the Winlink 2000 Network, is a worldwide radio messaging system that uses amateur-band radio frequencies and government frequencies to provide radio interconnection services that include email with attachments, position reporting, weather bulletins, emergency and relief communications, and message relay. The system is built and administered by volunteers and is financially supported by the Amateur Radio Safety Foundation.

Network 
Winlink networking started by providing interconnection services for amateur radio (also known as ham radio). It is well known for its central role in emergency and contingency communications worldwide. The system used to employ multiple central message servers around the world for redundancy, but in 2017–2018 upgraded to Amazon Web Services that provides a geographically-redundant cluster of virtual servers with dynamic load balancers and global content-distribution. Gateway stations have operated on sub-bands of HF since 2013 as the Winlink Hybrid Network, offering message forwarding and delivery through a mesh-like smart network whenever Internet connections are damaged or inoperable. During the late 1990s and late 2000s, it increasingly became what is now the standard network system for amateur radio email worldwide. Additionally, in response to the need for better disaster response communications in the mid to later part of the 2000s, the network was expanded to provide separate parallel radio email networking systems for MARS, UK Cadet, Austrian Red Cross, the US Department of Homeland Security SHARES HF Program, and other groups.

Amateur radio HF e-mail 
Generally, e-mail communications over amateur radio in the 21st century is now considered normal and commonplace. E-mail via high frequency (HF) can be used nearly everywhere on the planet, and is made possible by connecting an HF single sideband (SSB) transceiver system to a computer, modem interface, and appropriate software. The HF modem technologies include PACTOR, Winmor(deprecated), ARDOP, Vara HF, and Automatic Link Establishment (ALE). VHF/UHF protocols include AX.25 Packet and Vara FM.

Amateur radio HF e-mail guidelines 
Amateur radio users in each country follow the appropriate regulatory guidelines for their license. Some countries may limit or regulate types of amateur messaging (such as e-mail) by content, origination location, end destination, or license class of the operator. Origination of third party messages (messages sent on behalf of, or sent to, an end destination who is not an amateur operator) may also be regulated in some countries; those that limit such third party messages normally have exceptions for emergency communications. In accordance with long standing amateur radio tradition, international guidelines and FCC rules section 97.113, hams using the Winlink system are advised that it is not appropriate to use it for business communications.

Users 
The Winlink system is open to properly licensed amateur radio operators. The system primarily serves radio users without normal access to the internet, government and non-government public service organizations, medical and humanitarian non-profits, and emergency communications organizations. Duly authorized MARS operators may utilize the MARS part of the system. As of July 2008, there were approximately 12,000 radio users and approximately 100,000 internet correspondents. Monthly traffic volume averages over 100,000 messages.

For offshore cruising yachtspeople Winlink is widely used as an alternative, or alongside, Sailmail, which is an HF PACTOR based-email system using marine HF frequencies rather than amateur. As well as email the service uses a system called Saildocs, which allows cruisers to retrieve meteorological, maritime safety and other crucial files over email.

Supported radio technologies 
 802.11 "WiFi"
 ALE (Automatic Link Establishment)
 APRS (Automatic Packet Reporting System)
 AX.25 Packet Radio
 D-Star
 PACTOR
 PACTOR-II
 PACTOR-III
 PACTOR-IV
 WINMOR(Deprecated)
 ARDOP
 Vara HF
 Vara FM
 TCP/IP (Telnet and other Wireless Technologies)

Technical protocols 
PACTOR-I, WINMOR(deprecated), ARDOP, HSMM (WiFi), AX.25 packet, D-Star, TCP/IP, and ALE are non-proprietary protocols used in various RF applications to access the Winlink network systems. Later versions of PACTOR are proprietary and supported only by commercially available modems from Special Communications Systems GmbH. In amateur radio service, AirMail, Winlink Express, and other email client programs used by the Winlink system, disable the proprietary compression technology for PACTOR-II, PACTOR-III, and PACTOR-IV modems and instead relies on the open FBB protocol, also widely used worldwide by packet radio BBS forwarding systems.

Controversies and US regulatory issues  
In May 1995, the American Radio Relay League (ARRL) privately asked the FCC to change Part 97.309(a) to allow fully documented G-TOR, Clover, and original open source PacTOR (Pactor I) modes. The FCC granted this request in DA-95-2106 based on the ARRL's representation that it had worked with developers to ensure complete technical documentation of these codes were available to all amateur radio operators. However, subsequent versions of Pactor contained proprietary compression algorithms that prevent over-the-air interception.

In 2007, a US amateur radio operator filed a formal petition with the Federal Communications Commission (FCC) aimed at reducing the signal bandwidth in automatic operation subbands; but, in May 2008 FCC ruled against the petition. In the Official Order, FCC said, "Additionally, we believe that amending the amateur service rules to limit the ability of amateur stations to experiment with various communications technologies or otherwise impeding their ability to advance the radio art would be inconsistent with the definition and purpose of the amateur service. Moreover, we do not believe that changing the rules to prohibit a communications technology currently in use is in the public interest."

In 2013, the FCC ruled in Report and  against the use of encryption in the US amateur radio bands for any purpose, including emergency communications. The FCC cited the need for all amateur radio communications to be open and unobscured, to uphold the Commission's long-standing requirement that the service be able to police itself.

Opponents warn that the continual lack of enforcement by the FCC and continued allowance of "effectively encrypted" e-mail traffic in the amateur bands is a national security threat, and ham operators have written to the US Congress about the threat.

The Board of Directors of the Amateur Radio Safety Foundation, Inc. has written FCC Chairman Ajit Pai, other Federal Communications Commission members, and FCC administrators to correct inaccuracies in opponents' claims.

See also 
 Amateur radio emergency communications
 Automatic Link Establishment
 PACTOR
 Winmor

Footnotes

References

External links 
The official Winlink Web Site
Winlink Research Project
Winlink Tutorial
Winlink wide-area HF MESH network
Introduction to RMS Express Winlink client program
Guida italiana completa per l'uso di RMS Express /-/ Winlink 2000
The Wiki for Pat - a cross platform Winlink client
Guia rápida en Español de introducción a la Red WL2K, Winmor y uso del RMS Express, (Spanish White Paper)

Packet radio